Most country's administrations have regulatory authorities devoted to producing and publishing regulations for aeronautical operations.

Countries, organizations and publications
In Canada, the publication is called Canadian Aviation Regulations, and is produced by Transport Canada.

For a number of European States, the regulations are produced by the European Aviation Safety Agency.

In the United States, the publication is called Federal Aviation Regulations, and is produced by the Federal Aviation Administration.

In Brazil, the publication is called Regulamento Brasileiro da Aviação Civil - RBAC, and is produced by the National Civil Aviation Agency of Brazil.

See also
Aviation law
Aviation safety

Civil aviation authorities
Aviation law